The Donzère-Mondragon Dam (or André-Blondel dam), located in the French commune of Bollène-Écluse) is a hydroelectric dam and lock built in 1952 at the southern end of the Donzère-Mondragon canal, in the Vaucluse department in France.  It was registered in the list of historic monuments in France in 1992.

History 

This hydroelectric dam is in the French commune of Bollène in the Vaucluse department of south-eastern France.  Designed by architect Théodore Sardnal, it was built in 1947 and officially opened on 25 October 1952 by the French President, Vincent Auriol. Construction lasted five years.

See also 

 Tricastin
 Renewable energy in France

References

External links 
 

Dams in France
Dams completed in 1952
Hydroelectric power stations in France